Hartsock is a German surname likely derived from Herzog. Notable people with the surname include:

Ben Hartsock (born 1980), American football player
Ernest Hartsock, American poet
Jeff Hartsock (born 1966), American baseball player
Marcia K. Hartsock, Guamanian politician
Nancy Hartsock (born 1943), American philosopher
Robert W. Hartsock (1945–1969), United States Army soldier and Medal of Honor recipient